Furcraea is a  genus of succulent plants belonging to the family Asparagaceae, native to tropical regions of Mexico, the Caribbean, Central America and northern South America. Some species are also naturalized in parts of Africa, the United States (Florida), Portugal, Thailand, India, and Australia, as well as on various oceanic islands. They are xerophytic monocots.

Plants of this genus are the origin of fique or cabuyo, a natural fiber.

Species

See also
Fique

References

 Germplasm Resources Information Network: Furcraea
United States Department of Agriculture Plants Profile: Furcraea

 
Asparagaceae genera
Agavoideae